Pihouri Weboanga is a Burkinabé football manager, who managed the Burkina Faso national team in 2002 alongside Jacques Yaméogo.

References

Living people
Burkinabé football managers
Burkina Faso national football team managers
Year of birth missing (living people)
21st-century Burkinabé people